Ayrton Enrique Costa (born 12 July 1999) is an Argentine professional footballer who plays as a centre-back for Platense, on loan from Independiente.

Career
Costa arrived at Independiente in 2015. Five years later, the centre-back made the breakthrough into first-team football under manager Lucas Pusineri. He initially trained with the club in pre-season, notably appearing in a friendly win over Gimnasia y Esgrima. Costa's senior debut occurred on 6 December 2020 in a Copa de la Liga Profesional victory over Defensa y Justicia, as he played eighty-eight minutes before being replaced by Patricio Ostachuk. He penned terms on a contract until December 2022 on 15 December 2020.

Platense

Personal life
Costa's first name is an ode to Brazilian Formula One driver Ayrton Senna, who his grandfather was a fan of.

Career statistics
.

Notes

References

External links

1999 births
Living people
People from Quilmes
Argentine people of Brazilian descent
Sportspeople of Brazilian descent
Argentine footballers
Association football defenders
Argentine Primera División players
Club Atlético Independiente footballers
Club Atlético Platense footballers
Sportspeople from Buenos Aires Province